The Chilako River is a tributary of the Nechako River, one of the main tributaries of the Fraser River, in the Canadian province of British Columbia. It flows through the Nechako Plateau.

The name "Chilako" comes from the Dakelh name Tsalakhoh, meaning "the river in the hands of the beaver" or "beaver hand river".

Course
The Chilako River flows from Tatuk Lake, which is fed by numerous streams and other lakes. It empties into the Nechako River just west of Prince George.

See also
List of British Columbia rivers

References

Nechako Country
Rivers of British Columbia
Tributaries of the Fraser River
Cariboo Land District